"Little Hide" is the first single released by Scottish-Northern Irish alternative rock band Snow Patrol. It was released on 16 February 1998 under the Jeepster Records label. It is notable for being the first release by Snow Patrol for the label.

Voice message
The single was the first release by the band under the name "Snow Patrol" after changing from "Polarbear" due to copyright issues.

The actual voice message concerning this name change can be heard at the start of the song "Little Hide":

Track listing
7" Vinyl:
A: "Little Hide" - 2:41
B: "Sticky Teenage Twin" - 2:08

Maxi CD:
"Little Hide" - 2:41
"Sticky Teenage Twin" - 2:08
"Limited Edition" - 2:33
"Jj" - 1:47
"Little Hide" (Video)
The video for "Little Hide" was uncredited. It was not mentioned in the artwork.

Release and reception
The single was issued in two formats, Maxi CD and 7" Vinyl. It received mixed reviews from critics, earning 2 and a half stars from AllMusic's Nitsuh Abebe, who called the songs "competent". The single sold poorly and failed to chart.

References

External links
Official music video

1998 singles
Snow Patrol songs
Songs written by Gary Lightbody
Jeepster Records singles
Songs written by Mark McClelland
1998 songs